Pizzo Alzasca is a mountain of the Swiss Lepontine Alps, overlooking Cevio in the canton of Ticino.

On the south side lies the lake of Alzasca.

References

External links
 Pizzo d'Alzasca on Hikr

Mountains of the Alps
Mountains of Switzerland
Mountains of Ticino
Lepontine Alps